BMJ Global Health is a peer-reviewed scientific journal which publishes research articles and reviews about global health issues. 

The journal was founded in 2016 and is published by BMJ Publishing Group. , its editor-in-chief is Seye Abimbola from University of Sydney.

Abstracting and indexing 
The journal is abstracted and indexed in:

 Biological Abstracts
 BIOSIS Previews
 Current Contents
 MEDLINE
 Science Citation Index Expanded
 Scopus

According to the Journal Citation Reports, the journal has a 2021 impact factor of 8.056.

References

External links 

 

English-language journals
Public health journals
BioMed Central academic journals